The 1989 Open Championship was a men's major golf championship and the 118th Open Championship, held from 20–23 July at the Royal Troon Golf Club in Troon, Scotland. Mark Calcavecchia won his only major championship in a playoff over Greg Norman and Wayne Grady. It was the first playoff at the Open in fourteen years and the first use off the four-hole aggregate playoff, adopted in 1985. The playoff was formerly 18 holes the following day (and 36 holes prior to 1964). Calcavecchia was the first American champion at The Open in six years. Norman shot a course record 64 (−8) in the final round to get into the playoff.

Course

Old Course 

Lengths of the course for previous Opens (since 1950):

Opens from 1962 through 1989 played the 11th hole as a par-5.

Past champions in the field

Made the cut

Missed the cut

Round summaries

First round
Thursday, 20 July 1989

Second round
Friday, 21 July 1989

Amateurs: Claydon (E), Karlsson (+1), Els (+4), Evans (+5), Dodd (+10), Milne (+10), Hare (+11), O'Shea (+11), Noon (+14), Meeks (+17).

Third round
Saturday, 22 July 1989

Final round
Sunday, 23 July 1989

Amateurs: Claydon (+5), Karlsson (+11).

Source:

Playoff

The four-hole aggregate playoff was held on holes 1, 2, 17, and 18; three par fours and a par three (#17).

Scorecard
Playoff

Cumulative playoff scores, relative to par
Source:

References

External links
Royal Troon 1989 (Official site)
118th Open Championship - Royal Troon (European Tour)

The Open Championship
Golf tournaments in Scotland
Open Championship
Open Championship
Open Championship